Charles-Victor Hugo (4 November 1826 – 13 March 1871) was a French journalist, photographer, the second son of French novelist Victor Hugo and his wife Adèle Foucher.

Life and work
When Charles took up the fight against capital punishment in 1851 and found himself dismissed by the courts, he was jailed for 6 months for an article in L'Evénement. His father Victor Hugo gave a memorable speech in his defence on 10 June 1851.

When Louis-Napoleon came into power in 1851, Charles-Victor joined his father in voluntary exile in the island of Jersey, together with August Vacquerie he photographed family and friends, intending to publish a volume titled Jersey et les îles de la Manche, with poetry and drawings by Victor-Marie, prose by Vacquerie, Charles-Victor, and his brother, François.

In 1868 he started along with his brother François-Victor the newspaper Le Rappel.

He died of a stroke while on his way to meet his father for dinner.

References

External links 
 Victor Hugo family tree

1826 births
1871 deaths
Hugo family
19th-century French male writers
19th-century French journalists
French male journalists
19th-century French photographers